Tio University of Applied Sciences is a private Dutch educational institution, founded by the business community in 1969 in the city of Hengelo. Tio has establishments in Amsterdam, Rotterdam, Eindhoven, Utrecht, Hengelo and Groningen.

Tio offers recognized daytime courses at Hbo (Higher education), Mbo (Intermediate Vocational), and Master level in the fields of business management, law, finance, event management, hospitality and tourism.

Tio has been awarded with the title of ''small-scale and intensive education'' by the Dutch-Vlamish Accreditation organisation (NVAO). The institution regularly scores and ranks high in the Dutch Keuzegids HBO.

As of 2020 Tio University has been taken over by the Salta Group, a large Dutch educational institution. This means that some Schoevers-programs are now offered at the Tio locations.

History 
Tio has been established in 1969 by VVV-Director D.J.F. Wilmink on behalf of the business community in order to fulfill the need for educated people in the hospitality and tourism industry. In the early 70's tourism flourished explosively, but there was a lack of the right education and schools. Corporate responded by founding three institutions; Tio University of Applied Sciences, the AVR vocational school and the AVV vocational school. These trade schools were popular due to their short and focused programs which matched the needs of future employers. When the Dutch government stopped subsidizing these schools in the late 1980s, Tio proceeded as a private institution.

Duthler acquisition 
In the early 1990s Tio was experiencing a decrease in new student enrollments and around this period father and son Duthler took over the institution. This decrease was a result of the previous director who abolished the free public transport provisions that Tio students had been able to make use of. After the acquisition a restart followed and changes were implemented.

In 1993 and 1994 Tio took over the AVV vocational school and the AVR vocational school and in 1997, Tunon, a former hospitality school, was also acquired by Tio. From 1991 until 2020 Mark Duthler was the director of Tio, to be followed up by Katinka Reuling in 2020.

Courses 
Tio offers courses at Mbo (Intermediate Vocational), Hbo (Higher education), and Master level. The courses are taught in Dutch and a number of courses is also offered in English.

Mbo4 

 Hotelmanagement
 Commerce and Business Management
 Marketing and Communication
 Schoevers Management Assistant

The Mbo courses take 1 to 2 years to complete, depending on the prerequisites of the student. Mbo4 is an intermediate vocational level in the Dutch education system, the focus is on practical skills in the field of education.

Associate Degree 
Since 2020 the HBO courses are also offered as a two-year Associate-degree course. This is a degree level between Mbo4 and Hbo.

Bachelor courses 

 Hotel- and Eventmanagement (BA)
 International Touristic Management (BA)
 International Business Management (BBA)
 Commerce Economics and entrepreneurship(BSc)
 Financial Business Management (Bsc)
 Law (LLB)
 Communication Studies (BA)
 Real Estate
 Executive Office management Schoevers

The Bachelor courses typically take 3 to 4 years. After completing the course the student may use the internationally acknowledged title Bachelor of Arts (BA), Business of Administration (BBA), Bachelor of Science (BSc) or Bachelor of Laws (LLB).

Master of Business Administration (MBA) 
Since 2021 Tio also offers an MBA-program. This master-program takes 1 year to complete after completing an hbo-/bachelor- course, and no working experience is needed. The program consists of a core program and the areas of specialization are; International management, Hospitality or Commercial management.

Courses in English
The courses Hotel- and Eventmanagement, International Touristic Management, International Business Management en Commerce Economics and Entrepreneurship are offered in English in the Amsterdam, Rotterdam and Utrecht locations. The course International Business Management is offered in English in Eindhoven, Hengelo and Rotterdam.

Bachelor courses 

Hotel and Event Management
International Tourism Management
International Business Management
Commerce Economics and Entrepreneurship

Master's degree 
In Amsterdam, Utrecht and Rotterdam the MBA is offered in English.
Master of Business Administration (MBA)

Locations 
Tio has six establishments in Holland, the one in Utrecht is the main location and the student administration office is also located here. The locations are usually near stations and therefore easily accessible by public transport.

 Tio Amsterdam
 Tio Eindhoven
 Tio Hengelo
 Tio Rotterdam
 Tio Utrecht
 Tio Groningen

International 
Tio has an international character and therefore has ties to universities, colleges and companies worldwide for internships and exchange programs. A number of courses are therefore also offered in English.

Student Association Cognatio 
Student Association L.S.V. Cognatio has been founded in 2005 and is associated to Tio University. It currently has over 900 active members.

Trivia 

 Tio is an acronym for ''Toerisme Informatie Opleidingen'' which translates to ''Tourism Information Education''.

Gallery

See also
Education in the Netherlands

References

External links
Tio University website

Education in Amsterdam
Vocational universities in the Netherlands
Educational institutions established in 1969
1969 establishments in the Netherlands